Viktorsson is a surname. Notable people with the surname include:

 Jan Viktorsson (born 1967), Swedish ice hockey player
 Stina Viktorsson (born 1985), Swedish curler

Swedish-language surnames